The Savage Wild is a 1970 documentary film directed by, and starring, Gordon Eastman. It was one of a series of documentary films made by Eastman about life in the wild.

It was also known as Wild Arctic.

Eastman spent almost two years shooting the film in northern Canada.

Cast
Gordon Eastman as Gordon
Carl Spore as Red
Maria Eastman as Maria
Arlo Curtis as Arlo
Jim Thibaobeau as Jim
Robert Wellington Kirk as Bob
John Payne as John
Charles Abou as Cha-Lay
Alex Dennis as Cha-Lay's brother
Charley Davis as Charley
Wilber O'Brian as Helicopter pilot

See also
 List of American films of 1970

References

External links

The Savage Wild at TCMDB
Review at DVD Talk

1970 films
1970 documentary films
American documentary films
1970s English-language films
1970s American films